In this Japanese name, Ito is the family name.

 (1951 – September 22, 2021) was a Japanese performance artist, activist, and organizer based in Tokyo who presented her work in Japan and Asia, North America, and Europe. She was one of the few out lesbian artists in Japan.

Biography 
Tari Ito was born in 1951 in Tokyo, Japan. She began working as a pantomime performer in Japan and the Netherlands before becoming active as a performance artist in the late 1980s, and as a feminist and lesbian artist since the 1990s.  She established and founded the Women's Art Network (WAN) in 1994 in Tokyo, which organized Women Breaking Boundaries 21, an exhibition of women artists from Japan and other parts of Asia in 2001.  Ito set up PA/F (Performance Art/Feminism) Space in 2003. 

Ito's performance and artistic practice focused on exploring sexuality, military violence against women, and the fear of radiation exposure after Fukushima nuclear disaster in 2011. Her work "has continued to draw on themes and materials from daily life to produce live performance artworks that she believes can become catalysts for change".

Beginning in 2014, she lived with degenerative neurological conditions that limited her mobility, though she performed during that time. Ito died from amyotrophic lateral sclerosis on September 22, 2021, at the age of 70.

Work 
In 1996, Ito performed  at various venues in Japan, and as part of Womanifesto in Bangkok, Thailand, in 1997. Ito considers the piece, in which she comes out as lesbian, as a "turning point" in her career.

Her work has been featured in the 3rd Nippon International Performance Art Festival NIPAF '96 (1996), and the exhibitions Womanifesto and Womanifesto II (1999), Text and Subtext (2000-2003), Women Breaking Boundaries 21 (2001), and Women In-Between (2012).

References

External links 
 

1951 births
2021 deaths
20th-century Japanese women artists
20th-century Japanese artists
21st-century Japanese women artists
21st-century Japanese artists
Artists from Tokyo
Deaths from motor neuron disease
Japanese contemporary artists
Japanese performance artists
Japanese lesbian artists